Matt Stone Racing is an Australian racing team competing in the Supercars Championship with two Holden ZB Commodores. Jack Le Brocq drives the No. 34 car, while Todd Hazelwood drives the No. 35 car. They are also competing in the second-tier Dunlop Super2 Series with Aaron Seton and Ryal Harris.

Supercars Championship
Matt Stone Racing moved up into the Supercars Championship for 2018 with Todd Hazelwood. The team started in a Ford FG X Falcon previously owned by DJR Team Penske before switching to their Super 2 winning Holden VF Commodore from The Bend onwards. In 2019 the team upgraded to an ex-Triple Eight Racing Engineering ZB Commodore. Having leased a Racing Entitlement Contract (REC) from Jason Bright for the 2018 and 2019 seasons. 

In 2020 the team expanded to two cars having purchased RECs from Garry Rogers Motorsport and Kelly Racing. The new for 2020 number 34 was split between Jake Kostecki and Zane Goddard under the new Superlite Program. The two would also drive together for the Bathurst 1000. The 35 car was driven full time by Garry Jacobson, partnered with David Russell for the Endurance race. Jacobson finished 21st in the championship, with Goddard 25th and Kostecki 27th.

Super 2 Series

In 2011, Matt Stone the son of Stone Brothers Racing (SBR) co-owner Jim, was given the opportunity to run a former SBR Ford BF Falcon in the 2011 development series with Robert Cregan driving. In 2012, the team expanded to two Falcon BFs, with Daniel Jilesen and Ashley Walsh joining the team. After two rounds the team expanded to three cars, with the SBR entered Ford FG Falcon of Scott McLaughlin entry transferred to the team after the signing of Mahindra Group as a minor sponsor, conflicted with SBR's Ford sponsorship. McLaughlin went on to win the series. In 2013, the team entered three Falcon FGs with Michael Hector, George Miedecke and Ashley Walsh driving. In 2014, the team again fielded three FGs with Todd Hazelwood, Michael Hector and Ashley Walsh driving. Steven Johnson drove a fourth car at the Townsville and Queensland rounds. Ryal Harris drove the fourth car at Bathurst. Shae Davies replaced Hector for the final round in Sydney. In 2015, the team only fielded two FG Falcons, with Todd Hazelwood and Shae Davies competing in all of the rounds, finishing the championship in 4th and 8th places respectively. In 2016, the team purchased a Holden VF Commodore for Hazelwood. Adam Marjoram joined the team and raced in an FG Falcon. Hazelwood finished the year in 3rd place, while Marjoram finished in 13th.

In 2017, the team purchased another VF Commodore for Marjoram. Brodie Kostecki joined the team and raced an FG Falcon. Hazelwood won 6 races and was able to win the championship by 95 points. Kostecki finished in 15th, while Marjoram came 18th for the year. 

For 2018, Bryce Fullwood joined the team in an ex-DJR Team Penske Ford FG X Falcon, but switched to a VF Commodore after the Perth round. During the first 3 rounds the Commodore was raced by Tyler Greenbury and Jaie Robinson respectively. 

For 2019 Ash Walsh will contest the full season. Abbie Eaton entered the first round and Joel Heinrich entered rounds one and two for the team, David Russell would contest the Bathurst round. Walsh finished 9th for the year.

For 2021 MSR has signed Glenn Seton's son Aaron Seton.

For 2022 MSR has signed 2x SuperUtes Series champion Ryal Harris alongside Aaron Seton.

TCR Australia 
For the 2019 TCR Australia Touring Car Series the team would enter 2 Volkswagen Golfs in collaboration with former supercars driver Jason Bright known as Alliance Autosport. The 2 drivers would be Bright and New Zealand based Australian Alexandra Whitley. Bright would win the opening race at Sydney and would win another race at round 5 at Winton. Whitley would have more mixed results with only 3 top 10's. The team would hand over running of the cars to Melbourne Performance Centre for rounds 6 & 7.

Touring Car Masters 
In 2016 the team entered the Touring Car Masters. Team Owner Jason Gomersall was entered in a Holden Torana Coupe for the full season, along with Darren Beale entered for rounds 3 through 8 in a Holden Monaro GTS. Gomersall would go on to win the Pro Am Category.

For 2016 the team would keep Gomersall and Beale, adding Bob Wisely for select rounds in another Torana. Gomersall would finish 4th in the Pro Masters class, taking his first outright win at Winton. Beale would win the Pro Sports category, with Wisely finishing 3rd in Pro Sports despite missing a round, and failing to start the final two races at Bathurst after retiring from the first.

For the 2018 Season the team would downsize to running Gomersall as their only full time entrant. Beale would contest only a single round. Gomersall would again finish 4th overall in the Pro Masters class, taking another race win.

In 2019 Gomersall would enter only select race, electing to instead focus on his debut in the 2019 Kumho Super 3 Series. He would enter 8 races, taking 2 podiums on his way to 8th in the Pro Masters class.

GT Racing
In 2016 and 2017 Matt Stone Racing collaborated with Miedecke Motorsport to run Aston Martins in GT3 configuration. The highlights for the team were winning the Sydney Motorsport Park 101 as part of the 2016 Australian Endurance Championship and a fourth place in the top-ten shootout of the 2017 Liqui Moly Bathurst 12 Hour. The team would record a DNF after a crash 75 laps into the race.

Additionally in 2016, Matt Stone Racing would enter rounds 3 & 4 of the 2016 GT Asia Series. George Miedecke would contest both races, partnered by Nathan Morcom for round 3, and Ashley Walsh for round 4.

V8 Utes Racing Series 
In 2014 the team stepped into the V8 Utes Series, beginning at the 5th round at Sandown. They took over the preparation and running of Reigning Champion, Ryal Harris' Ute. The team scored a win on debut and went on to finish 5th overall for the year. 

For 2015, Harris Stayed on with the team, and was teamed up with George Miedecke. A third car was run, with rounds split between Grant Johnson, Aaren Russell, Chris Pither, Kurt Kostecki, & Todd Hazelwood. The team won their first championship, with Ryal Harris taking the crown, Miedecke ended the year 6th.

In 2016 the team ran Ryal Harris on a part-time basis, entering 5 rounds and taking 2 race wins along the way. Harris would finish 11th overall in the championship.

Results

Complete Bathurst 1000 results

Car No. 34 results

Car No. 35 results

Supercars Championship drivers
The following is a list of drivers who have driven for the team in V8 Supercars, in order of their first appearance. Drivers who only drove for the team in an endurance race co-driver basis are listed in italics.

 Todd Hazelwood (2018–19, 2022)
 Bryce Fullwood (2018)
 Jack Smith (2019)
 Garry Jacobson (2020)
 Zane Goddard (2020–21)
 Jake Kostecki (2020–21)
 David Russell (2020)
 Jayden Ojeda (2021)
 Kurt Kostecki (2021)
 Jack Le Brocq (2022)
 Aaron Seton (2022)

Super2 Championship drivers

 Stephen Voight (2011)
 Robert Cregan (2011)
 Daniel Jilesen (2012)
 Ashley Walsh (2012–14, 2019)
 Scott McLaughlin (2012)
 George Miedecke (2013)
 Michael Hector (2013–14)
 Todd Hazelwood (2014–17)
 Shae Davies (2014–15)
 Ryal Harris (2014, 2016, 2022)
 Steven Johnson (2014)
 Adam Marjoram (2016–17)
 Bryce Fullwood (2018)
 Tyler Greenbury (2018)
 Jaie Robson (2018)
 Abbie Eaton (2019)
 David Russell (2019)
 Joel Heinrich (2019)
 Aaron Seton (2021–present)

References

External links
Facebook page

Australian auto racing teams
Sports teams in Queensland
Supercars Championship teams
2011 establishments in Australia
Sporting teams based on the Gold Coast, Queensland
Auto racing teams established in 2011